Boryatino is a rural locality (a village) in Kletnyansky District, Bryansk Oblast, Russia. The population was 86 as of 2010. There is 1 street.

Geography 
Boryatino is located 18 km northwest of Kletnya (the district's administrative centre) by road. Osinovka is the nearest rural locality.

References 

Rural localities in Kletnyansky District